The Brahma Purana ( or) is one of the eighteen major Puranas collections of Hindu texts in Sanskrit Language. It is listed as the first Maha-Purana in all the anthologies, and therefore also called Adi Purana. Another title for this text is Saura Purana, because it includes many chapters related to Surya or the Sun God. The Brahma Purana is actually just a compilation of geographical Mahatmya (Travel Guides) and sections on diverse topics.

History 
The extant Brahma Purana is likely different from the original one. R. C. Hazra concluded that it is not the real one, but an Upapurana, which it was known as until the 16th century. Many of its verses are actually taken from the other Puranas. Moriz Winternitz concluded only a small part of it belongs to the older one. Since it mentions the existence of the Konark Sun Temple built in 1241, most of the chapter on pilgrimage sites in Orissa couldn't have been written before the 13th century. The surviving manuscripts comprise 245 chapters. It is divided into two parts: the Purvabhaga (Former Part) and the Uttarabhaga (Latter Part). The text exists in numerous versions, with significant differences, and the text was revised continually over time. Further, the Brahma Purana likely borrowed numerous passages from other Hindu texts such as the Mahabharata and Puranas such as the Vishnu, Vayu, Samba, and Markandeya.

Sohnen and Schreiner published a summary of the Brahma Purana in 1989.

Content 

The text is notable for dedicating over 60% of its chapters on description of geography and holy sites of Godavari River Region, as well as places in and around modern Odisha, and tributaries of Chambal River in Rajasthan.  These travel guide-like sections are non-sectarian, and celebrates sites and temples related to Vishnu, Shiva, Devi and Surya. The coverage of Jagannath (Krishna, Vishnu-Related) temples, however, is larger than the other three, leading scholars to the hypothesis that the authors of extant manuscripts may have been authors belonging to Vaishnavism. Its presentation of the Konark Sun Temple is notable.

The text also describes the Seven Continents (Sapta-Dvipa) and sub-continents of the world, though some other land mass are not mentioned, those which are mentioned are called:

 Jambu—It is the central one of the seven continents surrounding the Mountain Meru, so called either from the Jambu trees abounding in it or from an enormous Jambu tree on Mount Meru visible like a standard to the whole continent. Sec S. M. Ali, Op. cit., chapters V-VII on Jambudvipa.
 Saka can be identified with Malaya, Siam, Indo-China and Southern China or the South-Eastern corner of the land mass of which Jambudvipa occupied the centre.
 Kusa contains Iran, Iraq and the south-western corner of the land mass round Meru.
 Plaksa identified with the basin of Mediterranean since Plaksa or the Pakhara tree is the characteristic of warm temperate or Mediterranean lands identifiable with Greece and adjoining lands.
 Puskara covers the whole of Japan, Manchuria and the south-eastern Siberia.
 Salmala—the tropical part of Africa bordering the Indian Ocean on the West. It includes Madagascar which is the Hariṇa of the Puranas and the Samkhadvipa of some other writers who write similar scriptures.
 Kraunca represents by the basin of the Black Sea.
 Upadvipas (Sub-Continents): 1) Bharata 2) Kimpurusa 3) Harivarsa 4) Ramyaka 5) Hiranmaya 6) Uttarakuru 7) Ilavrta 8) Bhadrasva and 9) Ketumala. According to P.E. (p. 342) there are eight long mountain ranges which divide the island Jambu into 9 countries which look like nine petals of the lotus flower. The two countries of the north and south extremities (Bhadra and Ketumala) are in a bow-shape. The four of the remaining seven are longer than the rest. The central country is known as Ilavrta.

Out of 245 chapters, 18 chapters of The Brahma Purana cover the Cosmology, Mythology, Genealogy, Manvantara (Cosmic Time Cycles) and topics that are required to make a text belong to the Puranic genre of literature. Other chapters cover Sanskara (Rite Of Passage), summary of Dharmasastra, its theories on the geography of earth, summary of Samkhya and Yoga theories of Hindu Philosophy, and other topics. While many chapters of The Brahma Purana praise temples and pilgrimage, chapters 38-40 of the text, a part of embedded Saura Purana, present arguments that are highly critical of the theistic theories and devotional worship proposals of 13th-century Madhvacharya and Dvaita Vedanta sub-school of Hindu philosophies.

The Padma Purana categorizes Brahma Purana as a Rajas Purana, implying the text is related to Brahma, but extant manuscripts have nothing to do with Brahma. Scholars consider the Sattva-Rajas-Tamas classification as "Entirely Fanciful" and there is nothing in this text that actually justifies this classification.

The manuscripts of travel guide to Godavari-River Region from this Purana is found as a separate text, and is called Gautami-Mahatmya or Godavari-Mahatmya, while the one corresponding to Rajasthan region is called Brahmottara Purana. The tradition and other Puranas assert The Brahma Purana had 10,000 verses, but the surviving manuscripts contain between 7,000 and 8,000 verses exclusive of the Brahmottara Purana supplement which adds between 2,000 and 3,000 verses depending on different versions of the same text.

See also 
Bhagavata Purana
Vishnu Purana
Shiva Purana
Markandeya Purana
Gudhi Padwa

Notes

References

Bibliography

External Links 
The Brahma Purana English Translation By G. P. Bhatt, 1955 (Includes Glossary)
Brahma Puran, Sanskrit Manuscript, Archived By SanskritDocuments.Org
Brahma Purana (Sanskrit, IAST-Translit), SARIT Initiative, The British Association For South Asian Studies And The British Academy
Brahma Puran, Sanskrit, English, Hindi, Bengali And Telugu

Puranas
Surya
Vaishnava texts
Hinduism in Odisha